Jan Jones Blackhurst (born Janis Lyle Laverty, later Jan Laverty Jones; March 16, 1949) is an American businesswoman and politician. She was mayor of Las Vegas, Nevada from 1991 to 1999 and the first woman to serve as mayor of Las Vegas. Jones Blackhurst is a member of the Democratic Party.

Biography

Early life 
Jones Blackhurst was born in Los Angeles, California, raised in Santa Monica, and graduated from Stanford University in 1971. She became a recognized figure in Las Vegas in the 1980s, appearing as a spokeswoman in television commercials for her family's supermarket chain, Thriftimart, and later a car dealership owned by her then-husband, Fletcher Jones Jr.

Politics 
In 1990, Jones Blackhurst (known then as Jan Jones) ran for mayor of the City of Las Vegas; she was elected in 1991 and later re-elected in 1995, serving two four-year terms. During her time in office, Las Vegas' population grew significantly; Jones Blackhurst was credited for making the city "more livable" and directing attention towards social issues such as homelessness and LGBT rights.

While mayor of Las Vegas, Jones Blackhurst ran for Nevada governor twice, losing significantly in the 1994 Democratic primary to then-incumbent Bob Miller, and, after gaining the Democratic nomination in 1998, being defeated in the general election in 1998 by Kenny Guinn, the Republican nominee. In 1999, she chose not to run for a third term as mayor.

Post-politics 
After leaving the office of mayor, Jones Blackhurst worked for Caesars Entertainment, later serving as Executive Vice President.

As of July 2021, Jones Blackhurst sits on the board of directors of several organizations: Caesars Entertainment, Inc., the Las Vegas Convention and Visitors Authority, Sunrise Hospital, and the Las Vegas Stadium Authority, which owns Allegiant Stadium. She is also CEO-in-residence at the International Gaming Institute at the University of Nevada, Las Vegas.

Personal life
Jones Blackhurst is currently married to Dana Blackhurst, her second husband. They married in 2003, and Jones Blackhurst legally added the "Blackhurst" part of her surname in 2013. Jones Blackhurst has had six children.

Dana Blackhurst is an education advocate for learning disabilities who has headed several schools over the years, including Camperdown Academy (Greenville, South Carolina), Pine Ridge School (Williston, Vermont) and The Chandler School (also Greenville, South Carolina), which he founded.  They live near the Red Rock Country Club in western Las Vegas.

Honors 
In 2017, the Clark County School District named a Las Vegas elementary school after Jones Blackhurst.

External links

References

|-

1949 births
Activists from California
Harrah's Entertainment
Living people
Mayors of Las Vegas
Nevada Democrats
Politicians from Las Vegas
Stanford University alumni
United States Chamber of Commerce people
Women in Nevada politics
Women mayors of places in Nevada
21st-century American women